The Journal News may refer to the following United States newspapers:

 Journal-News, a daily newspaper in Butler County, Ohio
 Hamilton JournalNews, a former daily newspaper in Hamilton, Ohio, that merged into Journal-News of Butler County
 The Journal News, a daily newspaper in the Lower Hudson Valley of New York State
 The Journal-News (Hillsboro, Illinois)

See also
 News Journal (disambiguation)
 The Journal (disambiguation)